Smiles, Vibes & Harmony: A Tribute to Brian Wilson is a 1990 tribute album devoted to the compositions of Brian Wilson of the Beach Boys. It features cover versions mostly by alternative rock artists. The cover artwork is based on the artwork created for the Beach Boys' Smile album. Instead of the "Smile Shop", it depicts The Radiant Radish, a health food store that Wilson operated during the early 1970s.

Track listing

Personnel
Production staff
 Pete Ciccone — artwork
 Michael Sarsfield — mastering
 Tom Steele — mastering
 Barry Soltz — producer, compiler

References

The Beach Boys tribute albums
Brian Wilson
1990 compilation albums
Alternative rock compilation albums